Alberto Giraudo (born 27 June 1983) is a tennis coach and retired Italian tennis player.

Giraudo has a career high ATP singles ranking of 495 achieved on 4 August 2008. He also has a career high ATP doubles ranking of 630 achieved on 7 July 2008.

Giraudo made his ATP main draw debut at the 2015 Generali Open Kitzbühel in the doubles draw partnering Fabio Fognini.

External links

1983 births
Living people
Italian male tennis players